Marc Zinga (born 21 October 1984) is a Congolese-Belgian actor, singer and filmmaker.

Born in Likasi, Democratic Republic of the Congo, Zinga moved to Belgium with his family at the age of five. He was one of the lead singers of the group The Peas Project between 2003 and 2011. He began his acting career appearing in small film and television roles before landing major roles in the films Scouting for Zebras and May Allah Bless France! in 2014. In 2015, he received a Magritte Award for Most Promising Actor at the 5th Magritte Awards for his role in Zebras and, in 2019, the Best Actor Award at Pan African Film and Television Festival of Ouagadougou (Fespaco) for his role in the award-winning Rwandese film The Mercy of the Jungle.  

Among his current projects, as of November 2022, is Augure, a film directed by Belgian-Congolese rapper Baloji in his feature film debut. Zinga plays the lead role of Koffi, who returns to Lubumbashi after a 15-year absence.

Theatre

Filmography

As filmmaker

As actor

References

External links

 

1984 births
Living people
Belgian male film actors
Belgian male television actors
Belgian male stage actors
Belgian film directors
Belgian screenwriters
Belgian film producers
21st-century Belgian male actors
Magritte Award winners
People from Likasi
21st-century Belgian male singers
21st-century Belgian singers
Democratic Republic of the Congo emigrants to Belgium